Egypt has had a legendary image in the Western world through the Greek and Hebrew traditions. Egypt was already ancient to outsiders, and the idea of Egypt has continued to be at least as influential in the history of ideas as the actual historical Egypt itself. All Egyptian culture was transmitted to Roman and post-Roman European culture through the lens of Hellenistic conceptions of it, until the decipherment of Egyptian hieroglyphics by Jean-François Champollion in the 1820s rendered Egyptian texts legible, finally enabling an understanding of Egypt as the Egyptians themselves understood it.

After Late Antiquity, the Old Testament image of Egypt as the land of enslavement for the Hebrews predominated, and "Pharaoh" became a synonym for despotism and oppression in the 19th century. However, Enlightenment thinking and colonialist explorations in the late 18th century renewed interest in ancient Egypt as both a model for, and an exotic alternative to, Western culture, particularly as a Romantic source for classicizing architecture.

Antiquity

Classical texts
Herodotus, in his Histories, Book II, gives a detailed if selectively coloured and imaginative description of ancient Egypt. He praises peasants' preservation of history through oral tradition, and Egyptians' piety. He lists the many animals to which Egypt is home, including the mythical phoenix and winged serpent, and gives inaccurate descriptions of the hippopotamus and horned viper. Herodotus was quite critical about the stories he heard from the priests (II,123), but Diodorus Siculus, who visited Hellenistic Egypt in the 1st century BCE, gave credit to what he was told by priests: that many famous Greek philosophers had studied in Egypt. Both Plutarch and Diogenes Laërtius (3rd century) mention that Thales studied in Egypt, while nothing is really known about Thales from his own time. Iamblichus of Chalcis in the 3rd century CE reports that Pythagoras studied in Egypt for 22 years.

From the classical texts that thus evolved, a mythical Egypt emerges as the mother-country of Religion, Wisdom, Philosophy, and Science.

Among the Romans, an Egypt that had been drawn into the Roman economic and political sphere was still a source of wonders: Ex Africa semper aliquid novi; the exotic fauna of the Nile is embodied in the famous "Nilotic" mosaic from Praeneste, and Romanized iconographies were developed for the "Alexandrian Triad", Isis, who developed a widespread Roman following, Harpocrates, "god of silence", and the Ptolemaic syncretism of Serapis.

The Bible
The Septuagint, through which most Christians knew the Hebrew Bible, was commissioned in Alexandria, it was remembered, with the embellishment that though the seventy scholars set to work upon the texts independently, miraculously each arrived at the same translation.

Middle Ages and Renaissance
Following the 7th-century Muslim conquest of Egypt, the West lost direct contact with Egypt and its culture. In Medieval Europe, Egypt was depicted primarily in the illustration and interpretation of the biblical accounts. These illustrations were often quite fanciful, as the iconography and style of ancient Egyptian art, architecture and costume were largely unknown in the West (illustration, right). Dramatic settings of the Finding of Moses, the Plagues of Egypt, the Parting of the Red Sea and the story of Joseph in Egypt, and from the New Testament the Flight into Egypt often figured in medieval illuminated manuscripts. Biblical hermeneutics were primarily theological in nature, and had little to do with historical investigations. Throughout the Middle Ages "Mummia", made, if it were genuine, by pounding mummified bodies, was a standard product of apothecary shops.

During the Renaissance the German Jesuit scholar Athanasius Kircher gave an allegorical "decipherment" of hieroglyphs through which Egypt was thought of as a source of ancient mystic or occult wisdom. In alchemist circles, the prestige of "Egyptians" rose. A few scholars, however, remained skeptic: in the 16th century, Isaac Casaubon determined that the Corpus Hermeticum of the great Hermes Trismegistus was actually a Greek work of about the 4th century CE (even though Casaubon's work was also criticized by Ralph Cudworth).

18th century 

Early in the 18th century, Jean Terrasson had written Life of Sethos, a work of fiction, which launched the notion of Egyptian mysteries. In an atmosphere of antiquarian interest, a sense arose that ancient knowledge was somehow embodied in Egyptian monuments and lore. Egyptian imagery pervaded the European Freemasonry of the time and its imagery, such as the eye on the pyramid. Contemporaneously, the Great Seal of the United States (1782), which appears on the United States one-dollar bill also features this imagery. There are Egyptian references in Mozart's Masonic-themed Die Zauberflöte (The Magic Flute, 1791), and his earlier unfinished "Thamos".

The revival of curiosity about the Antique world, seen through written documents, spurred the publication of a collection of Greek texts that had been assembled in Late Antiquity, which were published as the corpus of works of Hermes Trismegistus. But the broken ruins that sometimes appeared in paintings of the episode of the Rest on the Flight into Egypt were always of Roman character.

With historicism came the first fictions set in the Egypt of the imagination. Shakespeare's Antony and Cleopatra had been set partly in Alexandria, but its protagonists were noble and universal, and Shakespeare had not been concerned to evoke local color.

19th century 
The rationale for "Egyptomania" rests on a similar concept: Westerners looked to ancient Egyptian motifs because ancient Egypt itself was intrinsically so alluring. The Egyptians used to consider their religion and their government somewhat eternal; they were supported in this thought by the enduring aspect of great public monuments which lasted forever and which appeared to resist the effects of time. Their legislators had judged that this moral impression would contribute to the stability of their empire.
The culture of Romanticism embraced every exotic locale, and its rise in the popular imagination coincided with Napoleon's failed Egyptian campaign and the start of modern Egyptology, beginning very much as a competitive enterprise between Britain and France. A modern "Battle of the Nile" could hardly fail to stir renewed curiosity about Egypt beyond the figure of Cleopatra. At about the same moment, the tarot was brought to Europe's attention by the Frenchman Antoine Court de Gebelin as a purported key to the occult knowledge of Egypt. All this gave rise to "Egyptomania" and occult tarot.

This legendary Egypt has been difficult, but not impossible to concile with the 1824 decryption of hieroglyphs by Jean-François Champollion. Inscriptions that a century earlier had been thought to hold occult wisdom, proved to be nothing more than royal names and titles, funerary formulae, boastful accounts of military campaigns, even though there remains an obscure part that might agree with the mystic vision. The explosion of new knowledge about actual Egyptian religion, wisdom and philosophy has been widely interpreted as exposing the mythical image of Egypt as an illusion that had been created by the Greek and Western imaginations.

In art the development of Orientalism, and the increased possibility of travel produced a large number of depictions, of varying degrees of accuracy. By the late 19th-century exotic and carefully studied or researched decor was often dominant in depictions of both landscape and human figures, whether ancient or modern. 
 
On the most popular 19th-century level, all of ancient Egypt was reduced in the European imagination to the Nile, the Pyramids and the Great Sphinx in a setting of sand, characterized on a more literary level in the English poet Shelley's "Ozymandias" (1818):

Egyptian Revival architecture extended the repertory of classical design explored by the Neoclassical movement and widened the decorative vocabulary that could be drawn upon.

The well-known Egyptian cult of the dead inspired the Egyptian Revival themes first employed in Highgate Cemetery, near London, which was opened in 1839 by a company founded by the designer-entrepreneur Stephen Geary (1797–1854); its architectural features, which included a 'Gothic Catacomb' as well as an 'Egyptian Avenue', were brought to public attention once more by James Stevens Curl.

Ancient Egypt provided the setting for the Italian composer Verdi's stately 1871 opera Aida, commissioned by the Europeanized Khedive for premiere in Cairo.

In 1895, the Polish writer Bolesław Prus completed his only historical novel, Pharaoh, a study of mechanisms of political power, described against the backdrop of the fall of the Twentieth Dynasty and the New Kingdom. It is, at the same time, one of the most compelling literary reconstructions of life at every level of ancient Egyptian society. In 1966, the novel was adapted as a Polish feature film.

20th century 

In 1912, the discovery of a well-preserved painted limestone bust of Nefertiti, unearthed from its sculptor's workshop near the royal city of Amarna, raised interest in ancient Egypt. The bust, now in Berlin's Egyptian Museum, became well known through the medium of photography and is one of the most copied works of ancient Egyptian sculpture, with Nefertiti's strong-featured profile a notable influence on new ideals of feminine beauty in the 20th century.

The 1922 discovery of the undamaged tomb of Pharaoh Tutankhamun revived public interest in ancient Egypt, the tomb's treasures influencing popular culture, including fashion and Art-Deco design. The discovery also led to the idea, promoted by the popular press, of a 'curse' that allegedly led to the premature death of those who entered the tomb. These claims were dismissed by Howard Carter who called them 'foolish superstition' and 'tommy-rot'. A more recent study by James Randi showed that expedition members who entered the tomb died at an average age of 73, slightly above the life expectancy of their social class at that time. The idea of a "mummy's curse" inspired films such as The Mummy, starring Boris Karloff, which popularized the idea of ancient Egyptian mummies reanimating as monsters. Agatha Christie's 1924 short story The Adventure of the Egyptian Tomb also refers to mysterious deaths during an excavation.

Hollywood's depiction of ancient Egypt is a major contributor to the fantasy Egypt of modern culture. The cinematic spectacle of Egypt climaxed in sequences of Cecil B. deMille's The Ten Commandments (1956) and in Jeanne Crain's Nefertiti in the 1961 Italian Cinecittà production of Queen of the Nile, and collapsed with the failure of Richard Burton and Elizabeth Taylor in Cleopatra (1963).

In 1978, Tutankhamun was commemorated in the song, "King Tut", by American comedian Steve Martin, and in 1986 the poses in some Egyptian mural art were evoked in the song "Walk Like an Egyptian" by The Bangles.

The Metropolitan Museum of Art resurrected the Temple of Dendur within its own quarters in 1978. In 1989, the Louvre raised its own glass pyramid, and in 1993 Las Vegas's Luxor Hotel opened with its replica tomb of Tutankhamun.

A best-selling series of novels by French author and Egyptologist Christian Jacq was inspired by the life of Pharaoh Ramses II ("the Great").

21st century 
HBO's miniseries Rome features several episodes set in Greco-Roman Egypt. The faithful reconstructions of an ancient Egyptian court (as opposed to the historically correct Hellenistic culture) were built in Rome's Cinecittà studios. The series depicts dramatized accounts of the relations among Cleopatra, Ptolemy XIII, Julius Caesar and Mark Antony. Cleopatra is played by Lyndsey Marshal, and much of the second season is dedicated to events building up to the famous suicides of Cleopatra and her lover Mark Antony in 30 BCE.

La Reine Soleil, a 2007 animated film by Philippe Leclerc, features Akhenaten, Tutankhaten (later Tutankhamun), Akhesa (Ankhesenepaten, later Ankhesenamun), Nefertiti, and Horemheb in a complex struggle pitting the priests of Amun against Akhenaten's intolerant monotheism.

American singer Katy Perry released in 2013 the song Dark Horse and the plot of the music video for the song was set it ancient Memphis. The video features numerous ancient Egyptian symbols and many of the things featured in it are historically accurate even though no egyptologists were consulted during its production. The turquoise makeup worn by Katy Perry in the video would have been used in Ancient Egypt, the dress she wore is similar in style to the Graeco-Roman clothes worn by nobles such as Cleopatra, the video features the Eye of Horus a powerful symbol in Ancient Egypt and the paintings behind the throne that Katy Perry sits on appear to have been made based on real examples from Ancient Egyptian tombs.

Notes

Bibliography
Assmann, Jan, Moses the Egyptian: The Memory of Egypt in Western Monotheism, Cambridge, Massachusetts, Harvard University Press, 1997, .
Breasted, James Henry, A History of Egypt from the Earliest Times to the Persian Conquest, with Illustrations and Maps, New York, Bantam Books, 1967.
Curl, James Stevens, The Egyptian Revival, revised and enlarged edition, New York, Routledge, 2005,  (paperback),  (hardback).
Herodotus, The Histories, Newly translated and with an Introduction by Aubrey de Sélincourt, Harmondsworth, Penguin Books, 1965.

External links
 Aegyptiaca - Journal of the History of Reception of Ancient Egypt

 
European culture